(born February 23, 1952, Sapporo, Hokkaidō, Japan) is a Japanese singer-songwriter and radio personality. She has released 44 studio albums, 46 singles, 6 live albums and multiple compilations as of January 2020. Her sales have been estimated at more than 21 million copies.

In the mid-1970s, Nakajima signed to Canyon Records and launched her recording career with her debut single, "Azami Jō no Lullaby" (アザミ嬢のララバイ). Rising to fame with the hit "The Parting Song (Wakareuta)", released in 1977, she has since seen a successful career as a singer-songwriter, primarily in the early 1980s. Four of her singles have sold more than one million copies in the last two decades, including "Earthly Stars (Unsung Heroes)", a theme song for the Japanese television documentary series Project X.

Nakajima performed in experimental theater ("Yakai") every year-end from 1989 through 1998. The idiosyncratic acts featured scripts and songs she wrote, and have continued irregularly in recent years.

In addition to her work as a solo artist, Nakajima has written over 90 compositions for numerous other singers, and has produced several chart-toppers. Many cover versions of her songs have been performed by Asian (particularly Taiwan and Hong Kong) singers. She is the only musician to have participated in the National Language Council of Japan.

Early life 
 was born in February 1952 in Sapporo, the capital city of Hokkaidō. Her grandfather, Buichi(武市), was a Hokkaido politician, and her father, Shinichiro(眞一郎), ran a clinic in obstetrics and gynecology. Her family moved to Iwanai when she was five, and lived there for six years. She spent most of her teenage years in the city of Obihiro, where she was one of the most eminent graduates of Obihiro Hakuyou High School, along with singer-songwriter Miwa Yoshida and television announcer Shinichiro Azumi. She graduated from Sapporo's Fuji Women's University in 1974.

Nakajima gave her first live performance during her third year in high school, playing a song she wrote titled "Tsugumi no Uta" onstage at a cultural festival.

In 1972, she played in a folk contest at the Hibiya Open-Air Concert Hall in Tokyo, winning the songwriting prize for her "Atashi Tokidoki Omouno."  The song, included in the contest album, became her first recorded material.

After graduating college, Nakajima continued to pursue a career as a professional musician for nearly a year.

Career as a recording artist

Early career (1975–1980) 
In May 1975, her composition "Kizutsuita Tsubasa (Wings of Love – I Knew Nothing)" won a prize at the 9th Popular Song Contest organized by the Yamaha Music Foundation. After signing a contract with Yamaha and Canyon Records, she debuted with a single "Azami Jō no Lullaby," which was released in September 1975. In October, Nakajima entered the Popular Song Contest with another song, "Jidai", which won the prize.  The song also won the grand-prix of the 6th World Popular Song Festival, another award organized by Yamaha, which was held in December.

In May 1976, she released her first studio album, Watashi no Koe ga Kikoemasuka. In 1976, Nakajima composed her first number-one hit single, "Abayo," which was recorded by Naoko Ken, and sold more than 700,000 copies.

Throughout her over 40-year career, she has written over 100 songs for other artists, including "Shiawase Shibai" (recorded by Junko Sakurada), "Kamome wa Kamome" (a comeback single for Ken, released in 1978), and "If I Could Take to the Sky (Kono Sora wo Tobetara)" (performed by Tokiko Kato, released in 1978). Nakajima occasionally released retrospective albums, composed of songs written for other artists. The first one, Okaerinasai, released in 1979, has sold more than 500,000 units, and it became one of her best-selling albums.

Miyuki Nakajima's fifth single "Wakareuta (The Parting Song)", released in September 1977, became her commercial breakthrough as a singer. The song reached number one on the Oricon for one week in December 1977, knocking "Wanted (Shimei Tehai)" by Pink Lady from the top of the hit parade. "The Parting Song" has sold more than 700,000 copies.

Her fourth studio album, entitled Aishiteiru to Ittekure, reinforced her enduring popularity as a performer. The album, which featured "The Parting Song," also included a protest song entitled "Sejou (World's Context)," which became popular after it was used in the TV drama Kimpachi Sensei in 1981.

In addition to her career as a recording artist, Nakajima has appeared as a personality on radio programs. She hosted All Night Nippon, one of the longest-running programs aired by the Nippon Broadcasting System, from April 1979 through March 1987.

1980s: Commercial peak and decline 
Nakajima experienced her commercial heyday in the first half of the 1980s. Seven of her studio albums that were released during this time (from Ikiteitemo Iidesuka to Miss M.) reached number one on the Oricon Charts successively. "Akujo" was released as a single in autumn 1981 and became her first number one on the Oricon singles chart since "Wakareuta" in 1977. Kansuigyo, her eighth studio album, featured another interpretation of "Akujo," and was her most commercially successful LP. The album peaked at number one on the Oricon for six weeks, and reached the top of the Japanese year-end albums chart of 1982. In the same year, she produced a couple of top three charting singles, "Yuwaku" and "Unrequited Love."

As a composer and lyricist, Nakajima continued to write for other artists. "Suzume (Sparrow)," the first solo single for ex-Pink Lady member Keiko Masuda, led the performer to the top 10 spot once again. In 1983, Nakajima won the 25th Japan Record Award for her songwriting on "Haru na no ni," a song sung by then-teenage pop icon Yoshie Kashiwabara.

"Cold Farewell (Tsumetai Wakare)," released as a single in 1985, was the first song she produced in countries outside Japan. The top 10-charting song features a lengthy harmonica solo performed by Stevie Wonder. He also played the synthesizer on Nakajima's subsequent single "Atai no Natsuyasumi," released the following year.

In 1987, Nakajima contributed lyrics for a composition by Tsugutoshi Goto, a bassist and a record producer who had been a longtime collaborator with her.

Nakajima wrote lyrics for pop song "Fu-ji-tsu" in 1988. It was released as a fourth single by teen idol Shizuka Kudo, who was also well known as an ex-member of Onyanko Club. During the late 1980s and early 1990s, Nakajima and Goto wrote 17 songs for Kudo, and some of them topped the chart, including "Dōkoku" (I Cried All Night) released in 1993 and certified quadruple platinum by the RIAJ for shipments of in excess of a million copies. Her songwriting partnership with Goto ended in 1993, but Nakajima has continued to write several songs for Kudo in later years.

Project with Ichizo Seo and Yakai 
Nakajima worked with longtime co-record producer Ichizo Seo for the first time on the album Goodbye Girl, released in 1988.  Nakajima, highly satisfied with the recording of the album, considered Seo to the most appropriate musical partner for her, and she has been working with him since the end of the 1980s.

After enlisting a new collaborator, Nakajima launched the experimental musical Yakai at the Bunkamura Theatre Cocoon, in Shibuya, Tokyo. Yakai was composed of intricate story lines she wrote, and it started initially as jukebox music mainly comprising her previously released songs. Her idiosyncratic efforts gradually became stage performances which she performed every December for 10 years. Since the 7th act, entitled 2/2, in 1995, Yakai was composed of new songs she composed especially for the performance. Most of these performances have been released on DVDs.

1990s 
Since the 1990s, Nakajima gradually began to appear on several television programs and commercials, although she continuously rejected offers to appear on the pop music television shows. In 1992, Nakajima appeared on the television drama Shin'ai Naru Mono e (titled after her 1979 studio album), performing a role as a doctor on the first and last episodes.

From 1993 through 2000, Nakajima appeared regularly on TV commercials for the Japan's Ministry of Posts and Telecommunications. The commercials (most of them featuring a new rendition of her early song, "Time Goes Around," recorded in 1993) were aired during the Bon Festival and holiday seasons in Japan.

"Asai Nemuri (Shallow Sleep)," a theme song Nakajima wrote for the drama Shin'ai Naru Mono e, was released as a single and found success, selling more than a million copies and peaking on the charts at number two. It was included on her studio album East Asia released in October 1992. The album also featured "Ito (Tapestry)," one of her songs that has been covered by many artists, especially famous for the interpretation by Kazutoshi Sakurai and Takeshi Kobayashi's charity supergroup Bank Band.

In the middle of the decade, she wrote a couple of theme songs for Ienakiko, the TV drama series starring Yumi Adachi, which was aired on the NTV. The song, titled "Sora to Kimi no Aida ni (Between the Sky and You)," was released as a single in May 1994, and debuted at number one on the Japanese Singles Chart. The song became her most commercially successful record to-date, selling in excess of 1.4 million copies. The other song, her composition "Wanderers Song," was featured on the sequel of the drama series aired the following year.  It also gained similar success, reaching number one on the charts and selling over 1 million units.

In March 1996 she released a greatest hits compilation, Daiginjo, which reached number one on the Oricon album chart, making her the oldest female artist to produce a number one album on the Japanese music chart at that time (the record was overtaken by Yumi Matsutoya and Mariya Takeuchi in later years).

However, each of her studio albums released in the 1990s were commercially lackluster, and some of them failed to reach the top 10 on the charts. Sun: Wings and Moon: Wings released in 1999, were her lowest-selling albums.  Both albums have sold less than 50,000 copies.

She is known as the first and the only musician who was a participant of the National Language Council of Japan, in which she took part in the late 1990s.

2000s 
A quarter of a century after her debut, Miyuki Nakajima left the Pony Canyon label and moved to the newly founded Yamaha Music Communications. There, she released a double A-side single "Earthly Stars (Unsung Heroes)"/"Headlight Taillight," which later became her most well-known songs.  She wrote the songs as theme songs for Project X, a television documentary program which premiered on NHK in March 2000. The single debuted at number 15 on the Oricon in July 2000, and it continued charting for over two years. To express her thanks for the unexpected commercial success of the theme songs of Project X, Nakajima decided to appear on the 53rd annual music program Kōhaku Uta Gassen, aired by the NHK on New Year's Eve of 2002, her first live performance on television since the late 1970s.

In 2006, Nakajima wrote the song "Sorafune (Ship in the Air)" for the boy band Tokio. The song was used as the closing theme for My Boss, My Hero, the TV drama starring the group's frontman Tomoya Nagase. It became the second most commercially successful material for the band, which followed their debut single, and remained on the Oricon chart for more than a year, selling approximately 480,000 copies. "Ship in the Air" was also the first chart-topper to which Nakajima contributed both lyrics and melody for other artists in 30 years, since "Abayo" was recorded by Naoko Ken in 1976. A month after the release of her studio album Lullaby Singer, which featured her own interpretation of "Ship in the Air," her contribution for the Tokio won "best lyrics" of the 48th Japan Record Award.

The studio album entitled I Love You, Do You Hear Me? was released on October 3, 2007. The album debuted at number four on the Oricon with in excess of 39,000 copies sold in its first week of release, and it provided Nakajima with her 34th top ten hit on the Japanese albums charts.

2010s 

In 2012, Nakajima wrote and performed the closing song "Onshirazu" (恩知らず) for the Japanese television series Tokyo Zenryoku Shoujo. She also made a cameo appearance in the first episode.

In 2014, Nakajima wrote and composed the song "Naite mo Iin Da yo" for the Japanese idol group Momoiro Clover Z. It was released on May 8, 2014. The song was used as the theme song for the film Akumu-chan: The Movie.

Nakajima performed the opening theme song to the 2014 NHK morning drama Massan, entitled "Mugi no Uta" (Wheat Song). She performed this song at the 64th Kōhaku Uta Gassen in the same year.

Honors 
In November 2009, Nakajima was awarded a Medal of Honor with purple ribbon by the Government of Japan.

Discography

Studio albums
  (1976)
  (1976)
  (1977)
  (1978)
  (1979)
  (1979)
  (1980)
 " (1981)
  (1982)
  (1983)
  (1984)
  (1985)
 miss M. (1985)
 36.5°C (1986)
  (1988)
  (1988)
 Kaikinetsu (1989)
  (1990)
  (1991)
 East Asia (1992)
  (1993)
 Love or Nothing (1994)
 10 Wings (1995)
  (1996)
  (1998)
  (1999)
 Moon: Wings (1999)
  (2000)
  (2001)
  (2002)
  (2003)
  (2004)
  (2005)
  (2006)
  (2007)
 Drama! (2009)
  (2010)
  (2011)
  (2012)
  (2014)
  (2015)
  (2017)
  (2020)
 （2023）

Filmography

Live performances

Tours 
 1977 Spring Concert
 1977 Autumn Concert
 1978 Spring Tour
 1978 Autumn Tour
 1979 Spring Tour
 1979 Autumn Tour
 Miyuki Nakajima Concert (1980 Autumn Tour)
  (1981)
  (1982)
  (1982–83)
 Nakajima Miyuki Concert  (1982–83)
 Nakajima Miyuki Concert '84  (1984)
 Nakajima Miyuki Concert '84  (1984–85)
 Nakajima Miyuki Concert '85  (1985)
 Nakajima Miyuki Concert '85  Page 85" (1985)
 Nakajima Miyuki Concert '86  " (1986)
 Nakajima Miyuki Concert '86  Page 86 " " (1986)
 Miyuki Nakajima Concert '87 "Suppin Vol.1" (1987)
 Nakajima Miyuki Concert 1989  " (1989)
 Concert Tour '90 "Night Wings" (1990)
 Concert "Carnival 1992" (1992)
 Concert Tour '93 "East Asia" (1993)
 Concert '95 "Love or Nothing" (1995)
 Concert Tour '97 "Paradise Cafe" (1997)
 Concert Tour '98 (1998)
 XXIc. 1st. (2001)
 Concert Tour 2005
 Concert Tour 2007
 Nakajima Miyuki Tour 2010
 Nakajima Miyuki  2012-2013
 Nakajima Miyuki  VOL.1 (2013)
 Nakajima Miyuki Concert「」2015-2016
 Nakajima Miyuki  VOL.2 (2018)
 Nakajima Miyuki 2020

Yakai 
 Yakai (1989)
 Yakai 1990 (1990)
 Yakai Vol.3 Kan-Tan (1991)
 Yakai Vol.4 Kinkanshoku (1992)
 Yakai Vol.5 "Hana no Iro wa Utsuri ni keri na Itazura ni Waga Mi Yo ni Furu Nagame Seshi Ma ni" (1993)
 Yakai Vol.6 Shangri-La (1994)
 Yakai Vol.7 2/2 (1995)
 Yakai Vol.8 Tou Onna (1996)
 Yakai Vol.9 2/2 (1997)
 Yakai Vol.10 Kaishou (1998)
 Yakai Vol.11 Winter Garden (2000)
 Yakai Vol.12 Winter Garden (2002)
 Yakai Vol.13 24-ji Chaku 0-ji Hatsu  (2004)
 Yakai Vol.14 24-ji Chaku 00-ji Hatsu  (2006)
 Yakai Vol.15 Ganso Konbanya  (2008–09)
 Yakai Vol.16 Honke Konbanya  (2009)
 Yakai Vol.17 2/2 (2012)
 Yakai Vol.18 Hashi no shita no Arukadia  (2014)
 Yakai Vol.19 Hashi no shita no Arukadia  (2016)
 Yakai Vol.20 Little Tokyo  (2019)

Awards

Kōhaku Uta Gassen Appearances

Video games
Nakajima Miyuki Namiromu (Sony PlayStation, October 15, 1998)

See also 

 List of best-selling music artists in Japan

Notes and references

External links 
 Official Site (Japanese)
 Nippop Profile | Miyuki Nakajima
Miyuki Nakajima Wikipedia (Japanese)

 

 

 
1952 births
Living people
Musicians from Sapporo
Singers from Hokkaido
Japanese women pop singers
Japanese women singer-songwriters
Winners of Yamaha Music Festival
Japanese radio personalities
20th-century Japanese women singers
20th-century Japanese singers
21st-century Japanese women singers
21st-century Japanese singers
Recipients of the Medal with Purple Ribbon
Fuji Women's University alumni